Enyalius catenatus,  Wied's fathead anole, is a species of lizard in the family Leiosauridae. It is native to Brazil. They can be found in the Atlantic Forest and can be found in other humid forests.

The body mass can be up to 38.66 g. The species is reproduces sexually and is gonochoric.

References

Enyalius
Reptiles described in 1821
Reptiles of Brazil
Taxa named by Prince Maximilian of Wied-Neuwied